Palm Springs is a desert city in California.

Palm Springs may also refer to:

Places 
 Palm Springs, California
 Palm Springs High School
 Palm Springs International Airport
 Palm Springs station, a train station
 Palm Springs, Florida
 Coachella Valley, California, also known as the Palm Springs area

Entertainment 
 Palm Springs (1936 film), a film directed by Aubrey Scotto
 Palm Springs (2020 film), an American romantic comedy film

See also
 
 North Palm Springs, California
 Palm Springs North, Florida